Sacred Heart Church  in St Kilda, Melbourne, is of architectural, aesthetic and historical significance to the state of Victoria in Australia. The church, which was built in stages, is one of the major landmarks of St Kilda.

Location 
The church is in a prominent location, situated at the centre of St Kilda. It is on the northeast of the well known Luna Park, a historic amusement park, and the Palais Theatre. Directly north of the church, is the public heart of Melbourne, Albert Park, which has been the home of Australian Grand Prix since 1996.

History 
In the 1880s, the number of people attending St Mary's kept increasing. In order to host them, land was bought and planned for a new Roman Catholic church on Grey Street, St Kilda.  The foundation stone was laid the same year the land was bought, on 13 July 1884 by Archbishop Goold and the church was dedicated on 7 December 1884. Reverend William Henry Quick who came to Melbourne in 1872, was the first priest for the church. He was born in England and educated in Spain. Father William Ganly became the successor to Father Quick when he died in 1899.

In 1922, the church was renovated by Kempson and Conolly, architects, and Brady, the contractor. The hipped roof campanile at the front was altered with another at the rear, measuring 36 meters with a copper dome topped with the statue of Christ. A fire broke out during the renovation work damaging one of the altars and burning all the vestments. In November 1922, Archbishop Mannix opened the newly renovated church which had cost £18,000, which would be £14,700 more than the original amount.

Architecture 
The Sacred Heart Church is of architectural significance due to its Italian Renaissance Baroque Style which indicated the abandonment of the Gothic Revival style favoured by Victoria's Roman Catholics. The three architects who took part in designing the Sacred Heart Church were Reed, Henderson & Smart.

It was only a year or two later until similar churches were being built in areas such as London, Paris, and Dublin. The Sacred Heart Church had set the new style for the subsequent Roman Catholic churches in Victoria, a style of which were Renaissance and Baroque designs with red bricks, cement dressings and a slate roof.

Although the church was dedicated in 1884, it was not yet completed until 1922. In 1890, the church had added the side aisles and the bell tower. The two architects who took part in the completion of the Sacred Heart Church were Kempson and Conolly.

The quality of its decorations, fixtures and fittings are an important feature of this church. The barrel-vaulted ceiling, sanctuary and nave show extensive painted and ornamented decorations. The use of gold leaf reflects the Catholic Italianate tradition in expressing the holiness through the stenciled ornaments. The High Altar made out of white Carrara marble, an exceptional example of Romanesque Revival style, was designed by Kempson and Connolly. The stained glass windows is also of interest, being the first use of Classical architecture into Roman Catholic Churches.

Music 
Music is an integral part of worship at Sacred Heart Church.
The church's two-manual of eleven stops pipe organ, which was built by George Fincham & Son, in 1910. The organ went through some minor modifications only for the wind system, everything else has remained the same since it was first built. The organ is located strategically at the centre, in the rear gallery, preserving its original tone scheme, tubular-pneumatic action, pipework, reversed console and unusual casework.

Sacred Heart Mission 
The church shared a separate legal entity in 1984 known as the Sacred Heart Mission. It is a welfare-based organisation which now generates multiple community groups serving different purposes for the needy. Their aim is to assist the unemployed, provide affordable housing, assist in aged care, and assist deprived and unemployed women. The women's Program is there to aid women working as prostitutes, heroin-addicted women, and women who have been abused. Another program, known as the outreach program, concentrates on visiting people who live alone, isolated from the public, some of whom suffer agoraphobia. Another program arranges visits as well, but instead, to the aged in nursing homes. The Sacred Heart Mission also assists people who die alone by providing them funerals and burials. Moreover, efforts are made to find the lost families of the individuals. Most of these movements are supported by the donations made from the community. As a result of this parish, attendance at the Sacred Heart Church has tremendously increased.

See also 
List of cathedrals in Australia

References

External links 

 Sacred Heart Church on Organ Heritage Trust of Australia website.
 Sacred Heart Church on Onmydoorstep website.
Walking Melbourne: Sacred Heart Church

Roman Catholic churches in Melbourne
Heritage-listed buildings in Melbourne
St Kilda, Victoria
Buildings and structures in the City of Port Phillip
Buildings and structures completed in 1890
1884 establishments in Australia